Phitchanon Chanluang (born April 7, 1997) is a Thai professional footballer who plays as a forward.

External links
 

1997 births
Living people
Phitchanon Chanluang
Phitchanon Chanluang
Association football forwards
Phitchanon Chanluang
Phitchanon Chanluang
Phitchanon Chanluang